Momotus is a small genus of the motmots, a family of near passerine birds found in forest and woodland of the Neotropics. They have a colourful plumage, which is green on the back becoming blue on the flight feathers and the long tails. The barbs near the ends of the two longest central tail feathers fall off, leaving a length of bare shaft so that tails appear racket-shaped.

Momotus species, like other motmots, eat small prey such as insects and lizards, and will also take fruit. They nest in tunnels in banks, laying about four white eggs.

The genus Momotus was introduced by the French zoologist Mathurin Jacques Brisson in 1760 with the Amazonian motmot (Momotus momota) as the type species.

Species
The species complex, the blue-crowned motmot (Momotus momota), has been split into several species. The genus now contains seven species:

References

Further reading

 Birds of Venezuela by Hilty, 
 A guide to the birds of Costa Rica by Stiles and Skutch 

 
Taxa named by Mathurin Jacques Brisson